Mária Krásnohorská (née Frištáková, born 15 August 1949) is a Slovak diplomat, who served as the ambassador of Slovakia to France (2001–2007) and Italy (2011-2015). She also served as the permanent delegate to UNESCO . In this position, she oversaw the inclusion of a traditional Slovak Shepard's flute Fujara on the UNESCO Representative List of the Intangible Cultural Heritage of Humanity.

Krásnohorská was awarded a Medal for her Contributions to the Slovak diplomacy by the foreign minister Ivan Korčok in 2021. She was also named Officer of the French Legion of Honour.

References

1949 births
Living people
Ambassadors of Slovakia to France
People from Topoľčany District
Officiers of the Légion d'honneur
Comenius University alumni